Glasgow Corporation Water Works and its successors have provided a public water supply and sewerage and sewage treatment services to the Scottish city of Glasgow. There were several schemes in the early part of the 1800s, with the Glasgow Company which was established in 1806 pumping filtered water from the River Clyde into the city. The Gorbals Gravitation Water Company was established in 1846, and brought water from reservoirs to the south-west of the city. However, an outbreak of cholera in 1848/1849, in which 4,000 people died, concentrated the minds of Glasgow Council, and in 1855 a scheme to use water from Loch Katrine,  to the north, was authorised. The work required at Loch Katrine was quite modest, and the major construction work was the building of an aqueduct to carry the water to the city by gravity.

The civil engineer John Frederick Bateman managed the contract, but the engineer for final section into the city was James Morris Gale, who became the Engineer in Chief for the Glasgow Water Commissioners when the project was completed in 1859. He oversaw the development of the system, with levels in Loch Katrine being raised and a second aqueduct being constructed, until he retired in 1902. Extra water was obtained from Loch Arklet in 1914, when a dam and tunnel into Loch Katrine were completed, but a similar scheme to impound water in Glen Finglas and feed it through a tunnel to Loch Katrine was delayed by the First World War, and was not implemented until 1965. A new treatment works at Milngavie costing £120 million was completed in 2008 and opened by Queen Elizabeth.

Glasgow also invested in sewerage, with sewage treatment works opening at Dalmarnock in 1894, Dalmuir in 1904 and Shieldhall in 1910. They carried out research into better ways to treat sewage, and until 1935 sold sludge cakes as "Globe Fertiliser". Surplus sludge was carried away by a fleet of sludge ships, to be dumped at sea, and the ships also took passengers along for the voyage, initially to help recuperating soldiers, but later for the general public. A major upgrade to the sewerage infrastructure took place in 2017, when a  tunnel was completed, to provide storm water storage, a project which reduces flood risk, and should ensure that the River Clyde is not polluted by sewage overflows in storm conditions.

History
The earliest known records of activity concerning a public water supply in Glasgow date from 1805, when the civil engineer Thomas Telford produced a report on schemes for supplying Glasgow and its suburbs with water. In 1806 he produced a second report and an Act of Parliament was obtained to create the Glasgow Company. They took advice from the Scottish inventor and mechanical engineer James Watt, and plans for a water treatment works on the north bank of the River Clyde were drawn up by Telford. The company constructed filtering beds and ponds, and bought two Boulton and Watt steam engines, but the system did not work well, and a new works was constructed on the south bank. In order to filter water from the river, they constructed a tunnel below river level, with open joints between the bricks, which allowed water to seep through the river bank, which was formed of sand, and to be drawn off from the tunnel.

A second company was established by Act of Parliament in 1812. The civil engineer and statistician James Cleland produced a report in 1813, on a scheme for raising and distributing water, and building public baths, and there was a flurry of activity in the 1830s. James Jardine, who was engineer for much of the early work for the Edinburgh Water Company, was consulted in 1834, Thomas Grainger published a report on the Glasgow water supply in 1835, and Robert Thom, the designer of the self-cleaning sand filter used in water purification, produced another report in 1837. The Glasgow Company took over the other company in 1838, but the quality of the water they supplied was poor, and there was general dissatisfaction with their performance. This resulted in a number of alternative schemes being considered.

This was abandoned when it was discovered that more compensation water would be required than the loch could hold. The neighbouring Loch Katrine was also considered, but was not pursued at that time. The engineer Nathaniel Beardmore moved to London in 1843, where he collaborated with James Meadows Rendel on a project for the Glasgow Gravitation Water Company. The scheme was for a reservoir at Gilmerston, in the valley of the River Avon, and a  aqueduct to transport the water to Glasgow. Some work was carried out in 1844, but the project was abandoned in early 1845.

The engineer for the scheme was William Gale, who supervised the construction of the works and two earth dams to impound the water, at Waulkmill Glen and Ryat Linn. The initial phase was completed in 1848, and a second phase, which included the construction of a third reservoir at Balgray, was finished in 1854. Some 75,000 benefitted from a constant supply of good quality filtered water, as Gale strongly advocated that water should be available all the time.

Residents in other parts of the city were not so fortunate, as the insanitary conditions led to an outbreak of cholera in 1848/1849, in which around 4,000 people died. In 1852 there was an attempt to revive the Loch Lubnaig scheme, but this was opposed in Parliament by Glasgow Council, and in this they were assisted by the civil engineer John Frederick Bateman. Having defeated the bill, they asked Bateman for advice on a suitable water supply, and he favoured the Loch Katrine scheme. The council then sought advice from other engineers on that and other schemes, but both Stephenson and Brunel supported Bateman's proposal. The council therefore sought authorisation for it, and an Act of Parliament was obtained on 12 July 1855.

Loch Katrine

Compared to the massive earth dams that were being built to supply Edinburgh with water at a similar time, the reservoir works for the Loch Katrine scheme were rather modest. The tunnelled sections and cuts were designed to carry the maximum allowed by the Act, but the pipelines were only sized to allow half of that volume initially. The service reservoir at Mugdock held , and from there it was conveyed into the city through twin  pipes. The scheme was completed in 1859 and was formally opened by Queen Victoria, having cost £918,000.

Twelve access shafts were constructed to allow work to proceed at multiple faces. 25 bridges were needed to carry the aqueduct pipes over depressions. It originally carried a single pipe, but a second was added above the first in the 1860s. A third pipe was added in 1881, carried by a steel trussed girder bridge on sandstone piers. The masonry was built of dry stone, but mortar was added in the 1860s.

While Bateman had managed the main pipeline, James Morris Gale became the resident engineer for the city section of the project. After it all opened in 1859, he became Engineer in Chief for the Glasgow Water Commissioners, a post he held for over 40 years until he retired in 1902. By 1882, the supply from Loch Katrine was no longer sufficient, and he suggested a scheme to double the pipeline, raise the levels in Loch Katrine a little more, and to obtain further sources from other lochs in the vicinity of Loch Katrine. This required the construction of a new dam, which was located just downstream of the first dam, and had nine sluices to control compensation water, rather than the four of the original dam. This work was carried out using direct labour between 1886 and 1896, and an official opening took place on 21 June 1901. Gale chose a more direct route for the new aqueduct, which involved more tunnelling, but by this time pneumatic drills and better explosives were available, and he felt that the long bridges such as that at Duchray were the least satisfactory element of the original design. Friction in the tunnels of the first route had reduced the throughput below what had been expected, and the new tunnels were lined with concrete to improve flows.

At Milngavie, Mugdock Reservoir was built as a holding reservoir for water arriving from Loch Katrine. A number of buildings with rubble walls and slate roofs dating from this first phase survive. In the 1890s when the pipeline was doubled, Craigmaddie reservoir was built to act as a second holding reservoir. Work started on 1 May 1896 and it was completed on 11 June 1896, but there were problems with leakage, and a deep trench was cut to resolve the issue, so it was not operational until 1 January 1897. A causeway and dam, which is faced with rubble, separates the two reservoirs. Both reservoirs have a draw-off tower and straining well, to remove debris from the water supply. The straining wells were decommissioned in 2007 as part of the construction of a new treatment works.

A further Act was obtained in 1902, which authorised the construction of a  dam at the western end of Loch Arklet to impound the water, and a tunnel through a ridge of hills at the eastern end, allowing the water to flow into Loch Katrine. Work on this scheme began in 1909, and was completed in 1914. Construction of a dam across the River Turk to impound water in Glen Finglas and excavation of a connecting tunnel to Loch Katrine was authorised by an Act of 1903, but little work was done due to the start of the First World War. By the time hostilities ceased, construction costs had risen significantly, and the project was deferred, with the tunnel finally being completed in 1958 and the dam in 1965. As the Glen Finglas scheme did not proceed at that time, the level of Loch Katrine was raised by another  between 1919 and 1929, by raising the height of the dam. When the work was completed, it allowed the top  of the loch to be used for water supply, representing a reserve of nine months.

Development
Restructuring of the water industry has followed a different path in Scotland to that of England and Wales. The Water (Scotland) Act 1967 was an attempt to consolidate the large number of water supply authorities, and created 13 regional water boards. Responsibility for Glasgow's water supply passed to the Lower Clyde Water Board, along with eleven other suppliers. Under the Local Government (Scotland) Act 1973, the functions of the water boards were taken over by regional councils, who were also given responsibility for sewerage and sewage treatment. Control of these functions works passed to Strathclyde Regional Council. It subsequently passed to the West of Scotland Water Authority in 1996, and in 2002 was transferred to the newly formed Scottish Water.

As regulations for water quality have become more stringent, there has been a need for more water treatment before water enters the domestic supply system. For the Loch Katrine water supply, this is handled by a works at Balmore and a new treatment works at Milngavie, which is partly underground, cost £120 million and was completed in 2008. The need for a new works was highlighted in August 2002, when following the 2002 Glasgow floods, the waterborne parasite cryptosporidium was found in the Mugdock reservoir, and 140,000 people had to boil their water before drinking it, until the problem could be eradicated. The construction project for the works was managed by Black & Veatch, and the impact on the landscape was reduced by constructing part of the works below ground, and using lamella clarifiers, which take up less room than sludge cone settlement tanks. The works was formally opened by Queen Elizabeth and won the 2007 Utility Industry Achievement Award, having been completed ahead of its time schedule and for £10 million less than its budgeted cost.

Sewerage
Since the publication of Edwin Chadwick's Report on the Sanitary Condition of the Labouring Population of Great Britain in 1842, there had been a growing understanding that the health of people in cities depended both on a clean water supply and an efficient method of disposal and treatment of sewage, to prevent the occurrence of waterborne diseases such as cholera. Despite such knowledge, little was done to provide sewers until there was a general outcry about the state of the River Clyde and other watercourses. When the Caledonian Railway wanted to construct tunnels below Glasgow's streets, a condition of their authorisation was that they had to reconstruct the sewers, such as they were, and on this they spent £200,000. Glasgow was effectively divided into three, with each sector having its own sewage treatment works. Dalmarnock Works was the first to open in 1894, to be followed by Dalmuir in 1904 and Shieldhall in 1910.

Dalmarnock Sewage Treatment Works was the first large-scale installation of its type in Scotland. Gustav Valentine Alsing, who was Danish and an acknowledged expert on chemical precipitation, designed the works. Construction began in 1893 and it was completed the following year. Sewage flowed into the works through three  channels, were floating material was screened off and incinerated. Grit, sand and other heavy solids settled out in catch pits, and was transported away from the site by railway, as the Caledonian Railway had a siding into the works. Sand filters provided the final stage of treatment, before the liquid was discharged into the Clyde. The coke filters were not particularly successful, and were abandoned in favour of precipitation. Sludge from this process was mixed with lime and the water content removed in filter presses, to form sludge cakes, which were also removed from the site by rail. A Cunmor drying plant was then installed, and the sludge cakes were marketed as "Globe Fertiliser", with sales reaching 32,000 tons per year by 1911. However, the works produced a greater volume than this, and the surplus was taken by boat to be dumped at sea near Garrock Head on the Isle of Bute. Production of "Globe Fertiliser" lasted until 1935.

The works experimented with bacterial treatment in 1900, and eight bacterial beds were constructed. Filter beds covering  followed in 1913, as a test bed for biological filtration. In 1914, a pumping main was constructed to carry untreated sludge from the works to the Shieldhall works, from where sludge boats took it to be dumped at sea. Ardern and Lockett had discovered the Activated Sludge Process while carrying out research at the Davyhulme Sewage Works in Manchester in 1914, and when the works was in need of improvement in the 1930s, a Simplex Activated Sludge Plant was built to try out the new process. A full activated sludge plant was built between 1962 and 1968 by the consulting engineers Babtie, Shaw & Morton, at a cost of £4 million.

It will reduce the risk of flooding and the likelihood that sewage will overflow into the Clyde during storms.

Sludge fleet
Once sewage had been processed, much of the sludge was taken by ship to be dumped at sea. Glasgow Corporation owned six ships at various times, and borrowed a seventh briefly. Dalmuir was ordered for the opening of Dalmuir Works, and Shieldhall was ordered for the opening of Shieldhall Works. Dalmuir was replaced by Dalmarnock, and the two ships shared the sludge workings. Shieldhall was loaned to Manchester Corporation between 1941 and 1947, as their vessel which carried sludge from Davyhulme Sewage Works had been destroyed by a mine. Dalmarnock was able to maintain the service from Glasgow, as the sludge was dumped near Loch Long, rather than near the Isle of Bute, due to the presence of a defence boom across the Firth of Clyde near Dunoon. Dumping of sludge at sea was discontinued in 1998, following the implementation of the EU Urban Waste Water Treatment Directive.

Most of the ships also carried passengers on the sludge runs, a tradition the probably began during the First World War, as a way to help convalescing soldiers, although there are suggestions that some poor and elderly passengers may have been carried before that war. Subsequently, the ships carried organised groups of passengers during the summer months. After it had spent a few years working out of Southampton for the Southern Water Authority, the second Shieldhall was bought by the Solent Steam Packet Co in 1988 for preservation, and offers trips from Southampton.

Bibliography

References

External links

Former water companies of the United Kingdom
Water supply and sanitation in Scotland
History of Glasgow